McAlpin is an unincorporated community in Suwannee County, Florida, United States. McAlpin has a post office with ZIP code 32062.

History
The town was settled in 1882, and had a population of 30 people by 1886. It was named after Daniel M. McAlpin, who was an early publisher of the Suwannee Democrat after he purchased the local newspaper which was then called the Live Oak Advertiser in 1875 and renamed it the Florida Bulletin. The name was changed to the Suwannee Democrat later.

References

Unincorporated communities in Suwannee County, Florida
Unincorporated communities in Florida